Eric Ellenbogen is an American entertainment executive known for co-founding Classic Media and serving as CEO of Marvel Enterprises from 1998 to 1999. He is the chief executive officer and vice chairman of WildBrain.

Education
Ellenbogen graduated from Harvard University in 1978 and the UCLA Anderson School of Management in 1982.

Career
In 1987, Ellenbogen became head of Broadway Video. In 1996, he became president of Golden Books Family Entertainment. Ellenbogen was appointed CEO and president of Marvel Enterprises in November 1998 and served until July 1999.

Together with John Engelman in May 2000, Ellenbogen launched Classic Media. After the sale of Classic Media to Entertainment Rights in 2007, Ellenbogen left the company, along with Engelman. The two collaborated in January 2008 with GTCR to form Boomerang Media, LLC. Boomerang Media purchased Entertainment Rights in 2009, bringing Classic Media back under his control.

In 2012, DreamWorks Animation acquired Classic Media and renamed it DreamWorks Classics. At that time, he became the head of DreamWorks Animation's television division, DreamWorks International Television. Later in 2016, DreamWorks Animation and its assets, including DreamWorks Classics, was purchased by NBCUniversal. DreamWorks Classics, reverted to the Classic Media name, was restarted with Ellenbogen as co-president and co-head of DreamWorks International Television.

In 2018, he joined the board of directors of Canadian animation company WildBrain. He was named WildBrain's CEO and board vice chairman in August 2019 after serving as a senior advisor since April 2019.

References

Living people
Harvard University alumni
UCLA Anderson School of Management alumni
DreamWorks Animation people
American chief executives in the media industry
Year of birth missing (living people)